Benyamina is a surname. Notable people with the surname include:

 Houda Benyamina (born 1980), French director and screenwriter
 Karim Benyamina (born 1981), Algerian football player 
 Ismaïl Benyamina (born 1983), Algerian football player
 Soufian Benyamina (born 1990), German football player

See also
Benyamin
Binyamina-Giv'at Ada, a town in Israel

Arabic-language surnames
Surnames of Algerian origin